Agios, plural Agioi, transcribes masculine gender Greek words meaning 'sacred' or 'saint' (for example Agios Dimitrios, Agioi Anargyroi). It is frequently shortened in colloquial language to Ai (for example Ai Stratis). In polytonic script it is written Hagios (for example Hagios Demetrios). It is also transliterated as, inter alia, Haghios, Ayios, Aghios (for example Ayios Dhometios, Aghios Andreas Beach, respectively) in the singular form, and Haghioi, Ayioi, Aghioi, Ayii in the plural (for example Ayioi Omoloyites, Nicosia, Aghioi Theodoroi, Ayii Trimithias respectively).

The feminine is agia, ayia, aghia, hagia or haghia (Greek:  or in polytonic form ), for example Agia Varvara (Saint Barbara).

See also
 
 Agia (disambiguation), the feminine form of the word in Greek
 Agis (disambiguation)
 Agii (disambiguation)
 Agius, a surname
 Agos, an Armenian newspaper
 Agoi, a clan and language spoken by that clan in Nigeria
 AGIO, the Australian Geospatial-Intelligence Organisation

Greek words and phrases